The Grammy Award for Best Hard Rock Performance was an award presented to recording artists at the Grammy Awards until 2011.

The academy recognized hard rock music artists for the first time at the 31st Grammy Awards (1989). The category was originally presented as Best Hard Rock/Metal Performance Vocal or Instrumental, combining two of the most popular music genres of the 1980s. Jethro Tull won that award for the album Crest of a Knave, beating Metallica, who were expected to win with the album ...And Justice for All. This choice led to widespread criticism of the academy, as journalists suggested that the music of Jethro Tull did not belong in the hard rock or heavy metal genres. In response, the academy created the categories Best Hard Rock Performance and Best Metal Performance, separating the genres.

The band Living Colour was presented the first award for Best Hard Rock Performance in 1990. From 1992 to 1994 the award was presented as the Grammy Award for Best Hard Rock Performance with Vocal. As of 2011, the bands Foo Fighters, Living Colour, and the Smashing Pumpkins share the record for the most wins, with two each. American artists have been presented with the award more than any other nationality, though it has been presented to musicians or groups originating from Australia twice and from the United Kingdom once. Alice in Chains holds the record for the most nominations without a win, with eight.

The award was discontinued in 2012 due to a major overhaul of Grammy categories. After 2012, quality hard rock performances were shifted to the Best Hard Rock/Metal Performance category. However, in 2014, the Best Hard Rock/Metal Performance category was split, returning the stand-alone Best Metal Performance category and recognizing quality hard rock performances in the Best Rock Performance category. According to the Recording Academy, "It was determined that metal has a very distinctive sound, and hard rock more closely aligns with rock and can exist comfortably as one end of the rock spectrum."

Recipients

 Each year is linked to the article about the Grammy Awards held that year.

References

General
  Note: User must select the "Rock" category as the genre under the search feature.

Specific

External links

Official site of the Grammy Awards
Rock on the Net – Grammy Awards: Best Hard Rock Performance

 
1990 establishments in the United States
2011 disestablishments in the United States
Awards disestablished in 2011
Awards established in 1990
Hard Rock Performance